Henry Grace (1907–1983) was an American set decorator.

Henry Grace may also refer to:

Henry Grace (cricketer) (1833–1895), English cricketer and brother of W. G. Grace
Henry Grace (Royal Navy officer) (1876–1937), Royal Navy officer, Chief of the Submarine Service, and son of W. G. Grace